Cumae may refer to any of several ancient Greek cities (Greek Κύμη, also spelled Kymē, Cyme, or Cuma:
 Cumae (Italy), an ancient Greek colony near Naples
 Cumae (Euboea), modern Kymi
 Cumae (Aeolis)